Ethmia punctessa is a moth in the family Depressariidae. It is found in north-eastern Mexico.

The ground color of the forewings is white, with a few scattered brownish scales and a small brownish black spot at the end of the cell. The ground color of the hindwings is white basally, becoming pale brownish distally.

References

Moths described in 1973
punctessa